The pygmy antwren (Myrmotherula brachyura) is a species of bird in the family Thamnophilidae, the antbirds. It is found in Bolivia, Brazil, Colombia, Ecuador, French Guiana, Guyana, Peru, Suriname, and Venezuela. Its natural habitats are subtropical or tropical moist lowland forests, subtropical or tropical swamps, and heavily degraded former forest.

The pygmy antwren is a bird of the entire Amazon Basin, the Guianan region, and the southeast Orinoco River Basin in Venezuela; besides northern Brazil, it occurs in Amazonian Colombia, Ecuador, Peru and Bolivia.

References

External links

Pygmy Antwren photo gallery VIREO
Photo-High Res; Article wingsbirds–"Peru-Explornapo Lodge"

pygmy antwren
Birds of the Amazon Basin
Birds of the Guianas
pygmy antwren
Taxonomy articles created by Polbot